An assertoric proposition in Aristotelian logic merely asserts that something is (or is not) the case, in contrast to problematic propositions which assert the possibility of something being true, or apodeictic propositions which assert things which are necessarily or self-evidently true or false. For instance, "Chicago is larger than Omaha" is assertoric. "A corporation could be wealthier than a country" is problematic. "Two plus two equals four" is apodeictic.

Notes

References
 Antony Flew. A Dictionary of Philosophy – Revised Second Edition St. Martin's Press, NY, 1979

External links
 

Modal logic
Term logic